Jason La Canfora (born April 14, 1974) is an American sportswriter, radio host, and television sports analyst.

Career

Television 
La Canfora joined NFL Network and NFL.com before the 2009 season and served as an NFL insider and reporter until 2012. La Canfora appeared on NFL Total Access, NFL GameDay Morning, NFL GameDay Final, and Thursday Night Kickoff. He also contributed stories and blogs to NFL.com. He replaced Adam Schefter, who left for ESPN. Before joining NFL Network, he worked ten years for The Washington Post and covered the Washington Redskins for six years. Prior to the Post, he was the Detroit Red Wings beat writer for the Detroit Free Press.

On June 1, 2012, La Canfora announced via Twitter that he would be leaving NFL Network on July 1, 2012, after his contract expires for CBS Sports, replacing Charley Casserly on The NFL Today pregame show on Sundays. He currently co-hosts Inside Access with Jason La Canfora and Ken Weinman on WJZ-FM.

Podcast 
La Canfora co-hosted the B-More Opinionated podcast with Jerry Coleman. It "is a hyper-local production that aims to connect with not just sports fans in the Baltimore area, but also people of all walks of life ..." The podcast went on hiatus beginning in April 2019. It was announced via the podcast's Twitter page on May 27, 2019, that the show would cease production, and the accompanying website (bmoshow.com) was shut down.

Personal life 
La Canfora currently resides in Baltimore, Maryland, with his wife Lauren and three children. La Canfora was an avid Boston Red Sox fan from 2004 to 2013; he is now a Baltimore Orioles fan. La Canfora has been open about his struggles with binge eating; as spoken about on his afternoon radio show.

References

External links

NFL.com bio

National Football League announcers
Living people
Syracuse University alumni
Detroit Free Press people
1974 births
Sportswriters from New York (state)